This is a list of presidents of the United States by time in office. The listed number of days is calculated as the difference between dates, which counts the number of calendar days except the last day. The length of a full four-year presidential term of office usually amounts to 1,461 days (three common years of 365 days plus one leap year of 366 days). If the last day is included, all numbers would be one day more, except Grover Cleveland would have two more days, as he served two non-consecutive terms.

Of the individuals elected president of the United States, four died of natural causes while in office (William Henry Harrison, Zachary Taylor, Warren G. Harding and Franklin D. Roosevelt), four were assassinated (Abraham Lincoln, James A. Garfield, William McKinley and John F. Kennedy) and one resigned from office (Richard Nixon).

William Henry Harrison spent the shortest time in office, while Franklin D. Roosevelt spent the longest. Roosevelt is the only American president to have served more than two terms. Following ratification of the Twenty-second Amendment in 1951, presidents—beginning with Dwight D. Eisenhower—have been ineligible for election to a third term or, after serving more than two years of a term to which some other person was elected president, to a second term. The amendment contained a grandfather clause that explicitly exempted the incumbent president, then Harry S. Truman, from the new term limitations.

Grover Cleveland is the only president to leave office and return for a second non-consecutive term. Consequently, while there have been 46 presidencies in the nation's history, only 45 people have been sworn into office as Cleveland is numbered as both the 22nd and 24th president.

Presidents by time in office

Notes

See also
List of vice presidents of the United States by time in office

References

External links

 Millercenter.org, American President: A Reference Resource
 Whitehouse.gov, The Presidents

United States, Presidents
Time in office